Tan Kar Hing (born 4 May 1982) is a Malaysian politician from the People's Justice Party (PKR). He is the incumbent Perak State Legislative Assemblyman for Simpang Pulai constituency. Tan was formerly a Member of Perak State Executive Council (EXCO) for Tourism, Art, and Culture during the Pakatan Harapan (PH) coalition rules from 2018 to 2020. Tan was also former Vice Leader of PKR Youth Wing (AMK) and is now acting as Vice Chairman of Perak PKR.

Political career 
Tan first contested the Perak state seat of Simpang Pulai in the 2013 general election (GE13) as a PKR candidate and won with a majority of 11,083 votes. He successfully defended the seat in the 2018 general election (GE14), almost doubling his majority.

Election result

External links

References 

1982 births
Living people
People from Selangor
Malaysian people of Chinese descent
People's Justice Party (Malaysia) politicians
Members of the Perak State Legislative Assembly
Perak state executive councillors
University of Putra Malaysia alumni
21st-century Malaysian politicians